Ipulo or Assumbo is a Tivoid language of Cameroon. The rather divergent dialects are Olulu and Tinta/Etongo.

References

Languages of Cameroon
Tivoid languages